The Durban bid for the 2022 Commonwealth Games was a rejected bid by Durban, South Africa and South African Sports Confederation and Olympic Committee (SASCOC) to host the 2022 Commonwealth Games.

Background 
The coastal South African city had previously considered bidding for the 2020 or 2024 Summer Olympics. If Durban were to host the games, it would be the first Commonwealth Games held on the African continent. South Africa's second largest city, Cape Town bid for the 2004 Summer Olympics, but lost out to Athens. Durban is home to major professional Rugby Union, Cricket and two association football teams – AmaZulu F.C. and Golden Arrows. The city has previously played host to matches of the 2010 FIFA World Cup, the 1996 & 2013 Africa Cup of Nations, the 1995 Rugby World Cup, as well as the 2003 Cricket World Cup. The Kings Park Sporting Precinct will be part of the bid. In addition Durban also hosted the 123rd IOC Session.

The city of Durban, South Africa was elected as the host for the 2022 Commonwealth Games on 2 September 2015, at a General Assembly in Auckland, New Zealand. It was reported in February 2017 however, Durban may be unable to host the games due to financial constraints. On 13 March 2017, the Commonwealth Games Federation (CGF) stripped Durban of their rights to host.

Venues 

The following were the proposed venues for the games:

References

External links 
 Bid website
 Candidate City File - Executive Summary
 Youth Plan
 Economic Impact Assessment

2022 Commonwealth Games bids
Sport in Durban